Phaesticus is a genus of groundhoppers (Orthoptera: Tetrigidae incertae sedis) found in Malesia and Indo-China.

Species
The Orthoptera Species File lists:
 Phaesticus hainanensis Liang, 1988
 Phaesticus mellerborgi (Stål, 1855) - type species (as Tettix mellerborgi Stål). Synonyms include: Phaesticus azemii Mahmood, Idris & Salmah, 2007; P.  carinatus Zheng, 1998; P. insularis (Hancock, 1907); P. sumatrensis (Willemse, 1928); P. uvarovi Storozhenko & Dawwrueng, 2015
 Phaesticus moniliantennatus (Günther, 1940)

References

External links

Caelifera genera
Tetrigidae
Orthoptera of Asia
Orthoptera of Indo-China